is a 2003 vertical bullet hell scrolling shoot 'em up developed by Team Shanghai Alice. It is the seventh game in the Touhou Project series. Playable characters include returning protagonists Reimu Hakurei and Marisa Kirisame, with Sakuya Izayoi featuring in her first playable appearance. The story centers around the chosen heroine traveling to Gensokyo's Netherworld to stop Gensokyo from being stuck in an eternal state of Winter when Spring fails to arrive. 

The full game was first released on August 17, 2003, at Comiket 64. The game introduces many gameplay changes over its predecessor Embodiment of Scarlet Devil, many of which would become standard in subsequent Touhou games, including the ability to see the player's own hitbox.

Gameplay

Perfect Cherry Blossom is a vertical scrolling shoot 'em up. The game offers three playable characters to choose from with two shot types each: Reimu Hakurei starts with three bombs, has the smallest hitbox, and the longest time in the game to deathbomb (activating a bomb shortly after being hit, cancelling out the death), but weak bullets. Marisa Kirisame is the fastest character, and has a lower boundary to collect all items onscreen, but has a narrow attack range, and starts with two bombs. Sakuya Izayoi has the largest area in which she can graze enemy bullets, a lower Cherry point penalty for dying, and can attack over an even larger area than Reimu. She starts with four bombs. As in Embodiment of Scarlet Devil, the player can enter Focus mode, slowing the player which makes it easier to dodge enemy attacks. The player's hitbox is now displayed when focusing, which makes it easier to dodge enemy bullets. The player can also use bombs, which grant invulnerability, clear the screen of bullets, and deals immense damage to enemies. The player has a limited supply of bombs, and each shot type also features a different bomb effect. Upon being hit by an enemy bullet, the player can avoid death by using a bomb within a small window of time, a technique known as "deathbombing". Throughout the course of the game, enemies will drop Power Items, which will increase the damage and rate of fire of the player's shot, and Point Items, which give the player points, which contribute to replenishing their lives and bombs. When at maximum shot power, the player can move to the top of the screen, to collect all onscreen items. The player will also receive a point bonus if they can 'capture' an enemy spell card – completing it without dying, bombing, or running out of time.

Perfect Cherry Blossom introduces the "Cherry" scoring system, unique to the game. Shooting enemies, and grazing (having enemy bullets reach the edge of the player hitbox) increases the "Cherry Meter", and bombing or dying decreases it. A higher cherry meter allows the player to gain more points from Point Items, and when a total of 50,000 Cherry Points are collected, the player will be given a Supernatural Border, a shield that lasts for seven seconds. While active, Point Items are collected instantly, and the player can be protected from one enemy attack, which will remove all onscreen bullets but end the shield prematurely. If the player is able to survive for the entirety of the shield's duration without being hit, an additional point bonus is granted. Other important gameplay changes introduced in Perfect Cherry Blossom include the player's shot having different properties if they are focused, a cursor on the bottom margin of the screen during a boss battle which tells the player where the boss is currently located, and a consistent time in which to perform a deathbomb.

Perfect Cherry Blossom consists of six regular stages with four levels of difficulty, and also offers a practice mode, allowing the player to play through a single stage at any time, provided they have completed it already. Depending on difficulty, a positive or negative multiplier bonus is applied and also given at the end of each stage. If the player completes the game without using a continue, they are shown the "good ending" of their particular shot type, and unlock an additional "Extra Stage". However, if the Extra Stage is completed, an additional "Phantasm Stage" is unlocked, which contains the conclusion to the game's story. As a result, in terms of the number of unique stages, Perfect Cherry Blossom is the longest game in the series, with eight.

Plot
In the spring of the 119th season of Gensokyo, the Spring Snow Incident (春雪異変) occurs. Gensokyo is stuck in an eternal winter, with snowstorms happening in May. The three heroines, each for their own reasons, set out to do something about the winter, and return Gensokyo's spring. As the Hakurei Shrine is old, the winter caused Reimu to be perpetually stuck in the cold, which motivates Reimu to resolve the incident. Upon finding a cherry blossom petal in her home in the Forest of Magic, Marisa is intrigued as to whether the eternal winter is affecting places outside of Gensokyo, and like Reimu, Sakuya has to end the winter, as otherwise she would run out of supplies to keep the Scarlet Devil Mansion warm. Canonically, Reimu is the one that resolves this incident.

After passing a barrier located above the clouds, the heroine enters the gate of the Netherworld (冥界). There she is confronted by half-ghost gardener Youmu Konpaku. Youmu explains that she had been stealing the essence of spring throughout Gensokyo in order to make the Saigyō Ayakashi (西行妖), a youkai cherry blossom tree, bloom perfectly under orders from her mistress, Yuyuko Saigyouji. The heroine defeats Youmu and proceeds to Hakugyokurō (白玉楼) to get Gensokyo's spring back. There the ghost princess of Hakugyokurō, Yuyuko, reveals that she had an interest in a corpse sleeping beneath the Saigyou Ayakashi from before her existence. In order to break the seal, the youkai cherry blossom tree needed to bloom fully. Yuyuko and the heroine fight to get the last "spring" contained in the heroine needed for the Perfect Cherry Blossom, and to reclaim Gensokyo's spring. After the heroine defeats Yuyuko, the Saigyou Ayakashi starts to lose its health. However, the seal has been weakened from the near-complete bloom, and the sealed soul is temporarily unleashed. The soul is revealed to be Yuyuko's, and the heroine fights her a second time, until Yuyuko's soul is finally sealed. As a result of the Spring Snow Incident, since the arrival of spring was late, the hanami season became short, and was also the trigger for the incident orchestrated by Suika Ibuki in Immaterial and Missing Power, the next Touhou game.

A few days later, Yuyuko asks the heroine for a favour. The magic boundary between Gensokyo and the Netherworld was weakened by Yukari Yakumo, one of Yuyuko's friends, to make stealing Gensokyo's spring easier, which resulted in many yuurei being seen in Gensokyo. Yuyuko asks the heroine to find her friend, who would be preparing for the flower-viewing event during this time, and remind her to repair the boundary. 

In the Extra Stage, the heroine searches for Yukari. Instead, the heroine meets Chen. It is revealed that Chen was the shikigami of Ran Yakumo, and Ran comes to fight the heroine after Chen is defeated again. Ran reveals that she is also a shikigami, and that she will not does not want anyone to disturb her master. The heroine fights Ran, knowing it will get her master's attention, and is victorious in battle.

Ran's master, Yukari, does not appear, and Ran tells the heroine that she should try coming back at night, since her master sleeps less often during the night. In the Phantasm Stage, the heroine returns that night and defeats a weakened Ran again, after which Yukari emerges to greet the heroine. Yukari is quite surprised at the heroine's ability and decides to continue where Ran left off. Yukari is defeated, and uses her abilities to fulfill the heroine's request. However, as this was not resolved and continues for a time, Youmu went to Gensokyo and gathered back the yuurei with a hitodama light.

Development
The first demo of Perfect Cherry Blossom was released at the 63rd Comiket on December 30, 2002. Another demo with only the MIDI soundtrack was released freely online on January 26, 2003. The final version was released on August 17, 2003, in the 64th Comiket, while distribution in doujin shops started on September 7 of that year. ZUN, the only member of Team Shanghai Alice, made another version of the game for the first Reitaisai, held on April 18, 2004, where a score attack tournament was held. This version features changed dialogue and background music for the Phantasm stage. The new track is included in the doujin CD  by Sound Sepher.

ZUN stated that Perfect Cherry Blossom is "not a very smart game", saying that since many new people are playing his games, it would be nice to have more fan service, but it is just more of the same. He says that this is on purpose, since doujin games give him the freedom to create what he likes as opposed to game companies where the main goal is to attract new customers.

Reception
In a review for Sick Critic, Max Broggi-Sumner said that "Perfect Cherry Blossom is a fantastic sequel, taking everything that made EoSD great and improving on it. With more playable characters, more welcoming mechanics, a second extra stage, a debatably better soundtrack, and just as entrancing bullet patterns, PCB is fantastic for both newcomers to the series who just want to beat the game on normal, as well as veterans who’re good enough to focus on getting a high score on Lunatic difficulty." On GameSpot, Perfect Cherry Blossom had an average user rating of 9.4/10.

According to ZUN, Perfect Cherry Blossom was the most popular Touhou game in the series.

British comedian and journalist Charlie Brooker, in his video game review show Gameswipe, presented Perfect Cherry Blossom as an example of the shoot 'em up genre that "masochistic maniacs actively enjoy dipping into". He said the game "sort of resembles a firework display being sick".

Notes

References

External links
  
 Perfect Cherry Blossom at Touhou Wiki

2003 video games
Vertically scrolling shooters
Touhou Project games
Bullet hell video games
Indie video games
Video games with alternate endings
Shoot 'em ups
Video games developed in Japan
Windows games
Windows-only games
Internet memes introduced in 2007